Houtong is a railway station on the Taiwan Railways Administration Yilan line located in Ruifang District, New Taipei, Taiwan. Houtong once sat on top of Taiwan's largest coal mine, but now visitors come to see the numerous cats living in the town.

Name
In 1962, the name was modified, but returned to the original in 2013. In Taiwanese Hokkien, the station name is announced as Kau-tong-a.

Around the station
 Houtong Cat Village
 Houtong Coal Mine Ecological Park

See also
 List of railway stations in Taiwan

References

1920 establishments in Taiwan
Railway stations in New Taipei
Railway stations opened in 1920
Railway stations served by Taiwan Railways Administration